Henry Brian Farley (1 January 1927 – 1962) was an English professional footballer who played for Chelmsford City and Tottenham Hotspur.

Playing career
Farley began his career at non-League club Chelmsford City before joining Tottenham Hotspur in July, 1949. The central defender made one appearance for the Lilywhites. His first and last senior match for Tottenham was against Middlesbrough on 18 August 1951 at Ayresome Park. In a 2-1 reverse, Farley scored an own goal

References

1927 births
1962 deaths
Footballers from Shropshire
English footballers
English Football League players
Chelmsford City F.C. players
Tottenham Hotspur F.C. players
Association football central defenders